The Henderson Fire Department (HFD) is the agency that provides fire protection and emergency medical services for the city of Henderson, the second largest city in Nevada with 279,226 residents spread out over .

USAR Task Force 

The HFD is a member of Nevada Task Force 1 (NVTF-1), one of 28 Federal Emergency Management Agency (FEMA) Urban Search and Rescue Task Forces (USAR-TF) that are prepared to respond to state or federal disasters throughout the United States. The task force team is deployed by FEMA for the rescue of victims of structural collapses due to man-made or natural disasters.

Stations and apparatuses

Notable fires fought

MGM Grand Fire

On November 21, 1980 the MGM Grand Hotel and Casino (now Bally's Las Vegas) in Paradise, Nevada suffered a major fire. The fire killed 85 people, most through smoke inhalation. The HFD was one of the main agencies to respond to fire which remains the worst disaster in Nevada history, and the third-worst hotel fire in modern U.S. history.

PEPCON Disaster

The PEPCON disaster was an industrial disaster that occurred in Henderson on May 4, 1988 at the Pacific Engineering and Production Company of Nevada (PEPCON) plant. The fire and subsequent explosions claimed two lives, injured 372 people, and caused an estimated US$100 million of damage. A large portion of the Las Vegas Valley within a  radius of the plant was affected, and several agencies activated disaster plans.

References

Fire departments in Nevada
Organizations based in Henderson, Nevada
Government of Henderson, Nevada